Paradise Industria Aeronautica Ltda is a Brazilian aircraft manufacturer based in Feira de Santana, Bahia State, founded in 2001. The company specializes in the design and manufacture of light aircraft in the form of ready-to-fly aircraft for the American  light-sport aircraft category.

The company's first aircraft design, the Paradise P-1 LSA is a two-seat light-sport aircraft for the American market. The aircraft was accepted by the Federal Aviation Administration as an SLSA and by January 2015 ten had been sold in the US.

The company has further developed the P-1 design into the P-1NG, the P-2 and the four-seat P-4. The company works in steel tubing, covered with aluminium sheet

The company initially set up a production facility in the United States, in Sebring, Florida to serve that market, but it was later closed. By 2015 the company had no representation in the US.

Aircraft

References

External links

Aircraft manufacturers of Brazil
Companies based in Bahia
Ultralight aircraft
Homebuilt aircraft
Brazilian brands